Linkurious is a software company that provides graph data visualization and analytics software for various use cases such as financial crime, intelligence, cybersecurity or data governance.

Linkurious has offices in Montreuil, France and Bethesda, MD, USA.

History 
Linkurious was founded in 2013 by Sébastien Heymann, David Rapin and Jean Villedieu following the development of Gephi, which was inspired by the prototype for Stanford's Center for Spatial and Textual Analysis project Mapping the Republic of Letters and looked at connections across thousands of communities in Europe and North America during The Enlightenment.

Products 
Linkurious Enterprise provides case management capabilities as well as detection, data search, visualization and exploration capabilities for various graph databases such as Neo4j, Azure Cosmos DB, TitanDB, DataStax, AllegroGraph and RedisGraph.

Linkurious' graph visualization tool is used for NASA's Lessons Learned database, identifying connections between seemingly unlikely subjects, such as a correlation between contaminated fluid and battery fire risk.

Applications

Panama Papers 
The ICIJ used a commercial version of Linkurious and Neo4j in the investigation of the Panama papers, uncovering 4.8 million leaked files consisting of emails, 3 million database entries, 2.2 million PDFs, 1.2 million images, 320,000 text files, and 2242 files, evidence of money laundering, tax evasion or political corruption.

Swiss Leaks 
The ICIJ also utilized the software during the Swiss Leaks investigation that revealed a massive tax evasion scheme in which 180.6 billion euros passed through HSBC accounts.

FinCEN files 
In 2020, the ICIJ used the software and Neo4j to visualize and explore  the FinCEN Files’ 400 spreadsheets containing data on 100,000 transactions.

Pandora Papers 
In 2021, the ICIJ leveraged the capabilities of Linkurious and Neo4j once more to analyse the data from the Pandora Papers. The leak involved 14 different offshore services firms and 11.9 million records, amounting to 2.94 terabytes. The network visualisations were able to help organise and explain the data.

Justice for Myanmar 
The campaign group Justice for Myanmar used the software to map the financial connections of the Myanmar military and publish the "Cartel Finance Map".

Obsalytics 
The non-profit organization Obsalytics combined Linkurious and open data to understand the main power structures and financial flows in Syria.

References 

Software companies of France
Graph databases
Social network analysis software
French companies established in 2013